Death at Breakfast is a 1936 detective novel by John Rhode, the pen name of the British writer Cecil Street. It is the twenty third in his long-running series of novels featuring Lancelot Priestley, a Golden Age armchair detective. It received a negative review from Cecil Day-Lewis, writing as Nicholas Blake in The Spectator noting "Some attempt is made to establish the character of the victim, but the remaining dramatis personae are stuffed men".

Synopsis
Victor Harleston is apparently poisoned at the breakfast table after drinking a cup of coffee. Its connection to two other crimes are not at first established by the investigating Scotland Yard officers and it falls to Professor Priestley to crack the case.

References

Bibliography
 Evans, Curtis. Masters of the "Humdrum" Mystery: Cecil John Charles Street, Freeman Wills Crofts, Alfred Walter Stewart and the British Detective Novel, 1920-1961. McFarland, 2014.
 Herbert, Rosemary. Whodunit?: A Who's Who in Crime & Mystery Writing. Oxford University Press, 2003.
 Reilly, John M. Twentieth Century Crime & Mystery Writers. Springer, 2015.

1936 British novels
Novels by Cecil Street
British crime novels
British mystery novels
British thriller novels
British detective novels
Collins Crime Club books
Novels set in London